Strontium hydride is an inorganic compound with a chemical formula SrH2.

Reactions 
Strontium hydride can be prepared by combining strontium and hydrogen:

Sr + H2 → SrH2

Strontium hydride reacts with water and produces hydrogen and strontium hydroxide:

SrH2 + 2 H2O → 2 H2 + Sr(OH)2

See also 

Beryllium hydride
Magnesium hydride
Calcium hydride
Barium hydride

References 

Strontium compounds
Hydrides